Ji Yanyan (born 29 May 1985) is a basketball player for China women's national basketball team. She was part of the squad for the 2012 Summer Olympics.

References

1985 births
Living people
Chinese women's basketball players
Basketball players at the 2012 Summer Olympics
Olympic basketball players of China
Basketball players from Heilongjiang
People from Suihua
Shanxi Flame players
Power forwards (basketball)
Small forwards
Heilongjiang Dragons players
Chinese women's basketball coaches
Henan Phoenix players